Rear Admiral Neil Rosayro is a retired Sri Lankan naval officer.

He joined the Navy in 1982.

He served as Director General Operations from 2013 to 2015 before being appointed Deputy Chief of Staff and the Commander Eastern Naval Area in 2015/2016. In May 2016, he moved to Headquarters as the Deputy Chief of Staff and the Commandant Volunteer Naval Force.

References

Living people
Sri Lankan rear admirals
Year of birth missing (living people)